Van Springel is a surname. Notable people with the surname include:

Herman Van Springel (born 1943), Belgian cyclist
Joris Vanspringel (born 1963), Belgian equestrian

Surnames of Dutch origin